Anders Szepessy (born 1960) is a Swedish mathematician.

Szepessy received his PhD in 1989 from Chalmers University of Technology with thesis Convergence of the streamline diffusion finite element method for conservation laws under the supervision of Claes Johnson. Szepessy is now a professor of mathematics and numerical analysis at KTH Royal Institute of Technology.

His research area is applied mathematics, especially partial differential equations.

Szepessy was an invited speaker at the International Congress of Mathematicians in 2006 in Madrid. He was elected a member of the Royal Swedish Academy of Sciences in 2007.

Selected publications

References

1960 births
Living people
Swedish mathematicians
PDE theorists
Chalmers University of Technology alumni
Academic staff of the KTH Royal Institute of Technology
Members of the Royal Swedish Academy of Sciences